Maveric Systems is an engineering services company founded in 2000. It works across digital platforms, banking solutions, data technologies, and regulatory systems. Maveric Systems has a dedicated offshore delivery and research centers in Chennai & Bengaluru, India.

Headquartered in Chennai, India, Maveric Systems has branches in Mumbai, Bangalore, Singapore, Mexico City, London, Dubai, Riyadh, New Jersey, and Kuala Lumpur. The firm operates in the APAC, Middle East.

History
The company was founded in 2000 by Ranga Reddy, P Venkatesh, NN Subramanian and VN Mahesh. The company initially offered testing services to banks and financial institutions but, by 2012, Maveric Systems diversified into requirements assurance, application assurance, and program assurance. Maveric additionally offered domain specialisation, platforms, and technical competency.

In 2018, the company expanded its board to include Chitra Ramakrishna, the former CEO and Managing Director of National Stock Exchange, and D. K. Sharma, a technology specialist and former CIO of Citigroup Global Consumer Banking’s International Business as independent Board of Directors.

Timeline

2007 

Partnered with UK's Real Consulting Services Ltd

2008 

 Introduced Testac, a proprietary intellectual property in the testing domain.
 Partnered with Wareef United of Saudi Arabia.

2009 

 Expanded operations and R&D facilities in Chennai.
 Expanded company to the Malaysia & Gulf region.
 Generated $8 million in revenue from the Middle East.

2011 

 Transformed into pure-play testing services company

2012 

 Maveric transitioned from a software testing company to a technology lifecycle assurance firm

2013 

 Partnered with DataCede to offer assurance services to insurance providers in the USA.

2016 

 Appointed 3 Vice Presidents to strengthen the domain, digital, and, technology-led offerings
 Collaborated with CA Technologies to respond faster to market dynamics.

2018 

 Chitra Ramkrishna and D. K. Sharma join the board of Maveric Systems as independent directors.

Awards

2007: Frost & Sullivan's Product Innovation Award for Offshore Testing
2008: Red Herring Asia’s top 100, one of the best IT companies
2011: NASSCOM Exemplary Talent (NEXT) Practices Award
2012: Listed amongst the top 100 Global IT and Business Process Outsourcing Companies 
2012: Recognised by the Department of Scientific & Industrial Research (Ministry of Science & Technology) for its R&D 
2012– 2016: "Best Technology Provider" for 4 consecutive years at the Banker Middle East Industry Awards

References

Software testing
Information technology industry of Chennai
Companies based in Chennai
2000 establishments in Tamil Nadu
Indian companies established in 2000